Stanislav Bachev (born 30 January 1978) is a former Bulgarian footballer who played as a defender.
 
In his career, he played for Pirin Blagoevgrad, Litex Lovech, with which he won two times the Bulgarian Cup, Marek Dupnitsa, FK Baku, with which he became a champion of Azerbaijan Premier League for 2008–09 season, and Beroe Stara Zagora .

Honours

Club
 Litex Lovech
Bulgarian Cup:
Winner (2): 2000–01, 2003–04
 FK Baku
Premier League:
Winner: 2008–09
 Beroe
Bulgarian Cup:
Winner: 2009–10

References

External links
 Profile

1978 births
Living people
Bulgarian footballers
First Professional Football League (Bulgaria) players
OFC Pirin Blagoevgrad players
PFC Litex Lovech players
PFC Marek Dupnitsa players
FC Baku players
PFC Beroe Stara Zagora players
Expatriate footballers in Azerbaijan
Bulgarian expatriate sportspeople in Azerbaijan
Association football defenders
Sportspeople from Blagoevgrad